1722 Goffin, provisional designation , is a stony asteroid from the central region of the asteroid belt, approximately 10.3 kilometers in diameter.

It was discovered on 23 February 1938, by Belgian astronomer Eugène Delporte at the Royal Observatory of Belgium in Uccle, Belgium. It was later named after Belgian amateur astronomer Edwin Goffin, following a suggestion by Jean Meeus.

Orbit and classification 

Minor planet 1722 Goffin orbits the Sun at a distance of 2.4–2.6 AU once every 3 years and 12 months (1,456 days). Its orbit has an eccentricity of 0.05 and an inclination of 5° with respect to the ecliptic. The body's observation arc begins 6 days after its official discovery observation.

Physical characteristics 

It is an assumed S-type asteroid, one of the most common spectral types.

Lightcurves 

(1722)'s first rotational lightcurve was obtained by American astronomer Richard P. Binzel at UT Austin in October 1984. It gave a rotation period of 31 hours and an brightness variation of 0.63 magnitude, while Czech astronomers Petr Pravec and Adrián Galád at Ondřejov Observatory derived a period of 28.8 hours with and amplitude of 0.6 magnitude using Binzel's photmetric observations.

Diameter and albedo 

According to the survey carried out by NASA's Wide-field Infrared Survey Explorer with its subsequent NEOWISE mission, Goffin measures 10.29 kilometers in diameter and its surface has an albedo of 0.224 (using the 2014-published revised near-infrared albedo fits), superseding a preliminary published diameter of 10.446 kilometers. The Collaborative Asteroid Lightcurve Link takes Petr Pravec's 2012-revised WISE data, that gave an albedo of 0.2175 and a diameter of 10.442 kilometers.

Naming 

This minor planet was named in honor of the Belgian amateur astronomer Edwin Goffin (b. 1950), who has made extensive computations involving minor-planet orbits, and whose initials are indicated by the body's provisional designation, . The official naming citation was published by the Minor Planet Center on 8 April 1982.

Notes

References

External links 
 Pravec, P.; Wolf, M.; Sarounova, L. (1984) http://www.asu.cas.cz/~ppravec/neo.htm
 Minor Planet Circular 6832 https://www.minorplanetcenter.net/iau/ECS/MPCArchive/MPCArchive_TBL.html
 Asteroid Lightcurve Database (LCDB), query form (info )
 Dictionary of Minor Planet Names, Google books
 Asteroids and comets rotation curves, CdR – Observatoire de Genève, Raoul Behrend
 Discovery Circumstances: Numbered Minor Planets (1)-(5000)  – Minor Planet Center
 
 

 

001722
Discoveries by Eugène Joseph Delporte
Named minor planets
19380223